Kostiantyn Yelisieiev (born September 14, 1970, Krasnoarmiysk, Donetsk region) is a Ukrainian diplomat. Ambassador Extraordinary and Plenipotentiary of Ukraine. He is deputy of head of Presidential Administration of Ukraine (2015).

Education 
Kostiantyn Yelisieiev graduated from Institute of International relations of Taras Shevchenko National University of Kyiv in 1992. He is fluent in French and English.

Career 

From 03.1992 to 01.1993 — He was Attaché of the Collegium Group of the Minister for Foreign Affairs of Ukraine.

From 01.1993 to 08.1993 — Attaché, Third Secretary, Directorate General for International Organizations of the Minister for Foreign Affairs of Ukraine.

From 08.1993 to 06.1994 — Third Secretary, Department for the United Nations political issuesand special bodies, Directorate General for International Organizations of the Minister for Foreign Affairs of Ukraine.

From 06.1994 to 09.1997 — Third, Second Secretary, Permanent Mission of Ukraine to the United Nations, New York City

From 09.1997 to 03.1999 — Second, First Secretary, Embassy of Ukraine, Paris.

From 03.1999 to 11.2000 — Senior Counselor, Directorate General for Foreign Policy, Administration of the President of Ukraine.

From 11.2000 to 01.2004 — Director of the Cabinet of the Minister for Foreign Affairs of Ukraine.

From 01.2004 to 10.2007 — Deputy Representative of Ukraine to the European Union, Brussels

From 10.2007 to 06.2010 — Deputy Minister for Foreign Affairs of Ukraine.

From November 2007 — Appointed Head of the Ukrainian delegation to the negotiations with the European Union on the Associated Agreement

June 29, 2010-July 15, 2015  — Appointed to the post of Representative of Ukraine to the European Union.

May 13, 2013 - appointed Commissioner of Ukraine on foreign policy and integration processes

From July 15, 2015 - he was deputy of head of Presidential Administration of Ukraine.

References

External links
 Mission of Ukraine to the European Union
 Kostiantyn Yelisieiev is ambassador of Ukraine to the EU
 Wide-ranging interview of Representative of Ukraine to the EU K.Yelisieiev to the UNIAN agency
 Personal appeal of Ukraine’s Ambassador to Europe
 The Mission of Ukraine to the EU has passed to the European Parliament the Appeal of the Verkhovna Rada of Ukraine calling for assistance in releasing political prisoners
 ARTICLE: Ambassador of Ukraine to the EU Kostiantyn Yelisieiev: Russian aggression in Ukraine threatens European security (The Parliament Magazine)
 Kostiantyn Yelisieiev: Appeal to Europe
 Top-10 Ambassadors in Ukraine and Abroad

Living people
1970 births
People from Donetsk Oblast
Taras Shevchenko National University of Kyiv, Institute of International Relations alumni
Ambassadors of Ukraine to the European Union
Recipients of the Order of Merit (Ukraine), 3rd class